North End Stadium is a multi-use stadium in East London, Eastern Cape, South Africa. It is currently used mostly for football matches and is the home ground of Bush Bucks and Birmingham City of South Africa.

In March 2019, Tornados F.C. owner Siphiwo "Mawawa" Nyobo was shot and killed outside the stadium.

References

Sports venues in the Eastern Cape
Soccer venues in South Africa